The Making Over of Geoffrey Manning is a 1915 American silent drama film directed by William P. S. Earle and starring Harry T. Morey, L. Rogers Lytton, Belle Bruce, Ned Finley, and Logan Paul. The film was released by V-L-S-E on December 27, 1915.

Plot

Cast
Harry T. Morey as Geoffrey Manning (as Harry Morey)
L. Rogers Lytton as Geoffrey's Father
Belle Bruce as Harmony Laurie
Ned Finley as Foreman
Logan Paul as Hennessey
Kate Davenport as Maime
Jack Brawn as Secretary
Marion Henry as Margaret
Eulalie Jensen as Mother
Thomas R. Mills as Hogarty (as Thom Mills)
Katherine Franek (uncredited)

Preservation
The film is now considered lost.

References

External links

Silent American drama films
1915 films
American silent feature films
American black-and-white films
Vitagraph Studios films
1915 lost films
Lost American films
1915 drama films
Lost drama films
1910s American films